Callum Thomas Ainley (born 2 November 1997) is an English professional footballer who plays as a midfielder for League Two side Crewe Alexandra.

Career
Ainley began his career in Crewe Alexandra's youth system and made his professional debut, aged 17, on 5 September 2015 in a 3–1 defeat against Swindon Town. He scored his first goal for Crewe in a 3–1 win against Doncaster Rovers on 30 April 2016. Exactly four months later, he scored his second senior goal in a 3–0 win at Accrington Stanley in a Football League Trophy tie on 30 August 2016. Two days after his 20th birthday, on 4 November 2017, he scored the 89th-minute winner in a 2–1 victory over Rotherham United in the FA Cup first round at Gresty Road.

On 3 May 2018, Ainley signed a new three-year contract at Crewe.

In December 2020, Ainley had surgery to repair a hamstring injury sustained in an FA Cup tie at Cheltenham Town. He returned to first team action on 14 March 2021, coming on as a second-half substitute against Burton Albion. He scored his first goal of the season in a 1–0 win at Bristol Rovers on 1 May 2021, and Crewe manager David Artell was keen to get him to sign a new contract. On 13 May 2021, Crewe announced that it had offered Ainley a new contract, and Ainley signed a two-year deal on 30 June 2021.

On 25 September 2021 at Rotherham United, Ainley suffered a new hamstring injury ruling him out of first team action for two months. He returned to the side on 1 December, playing the first half of Crewe's 2–0 win over Doncaster Rovers in the Football League Trophy, and played a total of 36 games as Crewe were relegated from League One.

After suffering a shoulder injury during a League Two game against Mansfield Town at Gresty Road on 24 September 2022, Ainley required surgery and was ruled out for around three months. He resumed first-team appearances coming on as a substitute in Crewe's goalless draw with AFC Wimbledon on 7 January 2023. Eighteen months after his last Crewe goal - against Hartlepool United in the EFL Cup in August 2021 - Ainley scored the opener in Crewe's 2–0 League Two win over the same opposition on 14 February 2023.

Career statistics

References

External links

1995 births
Living people
English footballers
English Football League players
Crewe Alexandra F.C. players
People from Middlewich
Association football midfielders